"Troubled Waters" is a song by Swedish singer Victor Crone. The song was performed for the first time in Melodifestivalen 2020, where it reached the final, finishing in ninth place with a total of 57 points. The song subsequently peaked at number 17 on the Swedish single chart. The single also appears on Crone's debut studio album of the same name.

Charts

References

2020 singles
English-language Swedish songs
Melodifestivalen songs of 2020
Swedish pop songs
2020 songs